Upper Middle Bogan is an Australian television comedy program created by Robyn Butler and Wayne Hope. It began screening on ABC on 15 August 2013. The series is directed by Hope and Tony Martin. Upper Middle Bogan was renewed for a second series of eight episodes, which began airing from 16 October 2014. Series 3 of the show aired in 2016.

Synopsis
Upper Middle Bogan follows the story of two different families connected by blood. Bess Denyar is a doctor who lives in a nice house in an inner city suburb of Melbourne with her architect husband Danny and 13-year-old twins Oscar and Edwina. Bess is stunned when she finds out from blood test results that she is adopted. This occurs when her overbearing posh mother Margaret is admitted to the hospital for high blood sugar levels. Bess tries to meet her birth parents, Wayne and Julie Wheeler. She is shocked to learn that she has three siblings (Amber, Kayne and Brianna) and that her biological family, the "bogan" Wheelers, head a drag racing team in the outer suburbs of the city.

Cast and characters

Main
 Annie Maynard as Bess Denyar
 Robyn Nevin as Margaret Denyar
 Patrick Brammall as Danny Bright 
 Glenn Robbins as Wayne Wheeler
 Robyn Malcolm as Julie Wheeler
 Michala Banas as Amber Wheeler
 Maddy Jevic as Brianna Wheeler
 Rhys Mitchell as Kayne Wheeler 
 Harrison Feldman as Oscar Bright 
 Lara Robinson as Edwina Bright
 Dougie Baldwin as Shawn Van Winkle

Recurring
 Dave Thornton as Troy Van Winkle (Amber's ex-boyfriend and Shawn's father)
 Sue Jones as Pat (Margaret's best friend)
 Khaled Khalafalla as Younis
 Martin Dingle-Wall as Evan

Filming locations
The town house featured as Margaret Denyar's house in Upper Middle Bogan is located at Summerhill Road in Brighton East, Victoria. It is used to shoot both interior and exterior scenes for the series. The house was sold for $1,905,000 at an auction held on 24 May 2014.

The house featured as the Wheeler's House is located at 61 Saratoga Crescent in Keilor Downs, Victoria, which can be confirmed by comparing the opening scenes with Google maps earth view (see solar panels on neighbor's house). Amber's new house is at Copernicus Way. The Driving Office scenes were filmed in Gisborne, Victoria, as were the motel scenes.

The scenes with the dragster are shot at the Calder Park Raceway.

Episodes

International broadcasts
In the United States the show is titled Bess of Both Worlds and began streaming from 4 March 2015 on the subscription video-on-demand service Hulu.  In New Zealand, the show airs Thursday nights at 10:00 pm on TV One. Episodes are available weekly to stream through TVNZ's Watch Now service.

Awards and nominations

See also
List of Australian television series
List of Australian Broadcasting Corporation programs
Upper middle class
Bogan

References

External links
Website on ABC 

2013 Australian television series debuts
Australian Broadcasting Corporation original programming
Australian comedy television series
Television shows set in Melbourne
Australian television sitcoms